This is a list of the mammal species recorded in Zanzibar. These are the mammal species in Zanzibar and Pemba islands of eastern coast of Tanzania Archipelago. The first detailed work on mammalian diversity of these two islands was done from 1942 to 1983. Out of 53 mammals found in Zanzibar, 17 species are found only in Zanzibar islands, whereas 6 species are restricted to Pemba Island and 17 others found in both islands. Seven introduced species such as mongooses, pigs and rat species are also abundant.

The following tags are used to highlight each species' conservation status as assessed by the International Union for Conservation of Nature:

The mammals restricted only to Pemba Island are highlighted by P.

Order: Eulipotyphla (shrews) 
The order Eulipotyphla contains the shrews of southern Africa and the shrew moles, comprising four living families of small mammals that were traditionally part of the order Insectivora.

Family: Soricidae (musk shrews)
Subfamily: Crocidurinae
Genus: Crocidura
 Greater red musk shrew, Crocidura flavescens ssp. nyansae LC
 Bicolored musk shrew, Crocidura fuscomurina ssp. sansibarica LC
 Savanna path shrew, Crocidura viaria ssp. suahelae LC 
Genus: Suncus
 Asian house shrew, Suncus murinus LC

Order: Macroscelidea (elephant shrews) 

Often called elephant shrews or jumping shrews are native to southern Africa.

Family: Macroscelididae (elephant-shrews)
Genus: Rhynchocyon
 Black and rufous elephant shrew, Rhynchocyon petersi ssp. adersi VU

Order: Chiroptera (bats) 

Bats are the only true fliers in mammalian stock. The flight has given by the membranous skin attached to its elongated fingers. The species found across the globe and accounts for 20% of all mammals described.

Family: Pteropodidae (flying foxes, Old World fruit bats)
Subfamily: Pteropodinae
Genus: Eidolon
 Straw-coloured fruit bat, Eidolon helvum ssp. helvum LC
Genus: Epomophorus
 Minor epauletted fruit bat, Epomophorus minor LC
 Wahlberg's epauletted fruit bat, Epomophorus wahlbergi ssp. wahlbergi LC
Genus: Pteropus
 Pemba flying fox, Pteropus voeltzkowi VU
Genus: Rousettus
 Egyptian fruit bat, Rousettus aegyptiacus ssp. leachii LC - P
Family: Vespertilionidae
Subfamily: Vespertilioninae
Genus: Neoromicia
 Cape serotine, Neoromicia capensis ssp. grandidieri LC
 Banana pipistrelle, Neoromicia nanus ssp. nanus LC
Genus: Scotophilus
 Lesser yellow bat, Scotophilus borbonicus DD
 Schreber's yellow bat, Scotophilus nigrita NT
Family: Emballonuridae
Genus: Coleura
 African sheath-tailed bat, Coleura afra LC - P
Genus: Taphozous
 Mauritian tomb bat, Taphozous mauritianus LC
Family: Nycteridae
Genus: Nycteris
 Large slit-faced bat, Nycteris grandis LC
 Hairy slit-faced bat, Nycteris hispida LC
 Large-eared slit-faced bat, Nycteris macrotis ssp. luteola LC
 Egyptian slit-faced bat, Nycteris thebaica LC
Family: Megadermatidae
Genus: Cardioderma
 Heart-nosed bat, Cardioderma cor LC
Genus: Lavia
 Yellow-winged bat, Lavia frons LC
Family: Rhinolophidae
Subfamily: Rhinolophinae
Genus: Rhinolophus
 Decken's horseshoe bat, Rhinolophus deckenii DD
 Swinny's horseshoe bat, Rhinolophus swinnyi NT
Subfamily: Hipposiderinae
Genus: Hipposideros
 Sundevall's roundleaf bat, Hipposideros caffer ssp. caffer LC
 Commerson's leaf-nosed bat, Hipposideros commersoni ssp. marungensis NT
Family: Molossidae
Genus: Mops
 Sierra Leone free-tailed bat, Mops brachypterus LC
Genus: Chaerephon
 Little free-tailed bat, Chaerephon pumilus LC

Order: Primates 

The order Primates contains humans and their closest relatives ranging from most primitive lemurs, lorisoids, tarsiers, to monkeys, and great apes. The most intelligent group of mammals, they are well distributed around Africa, South America and Asia with more than 100 described species.

Suborder: Strepsirrhini
Infraorder: Lemuriformes
Superfamily: Lorisoidea
Family: Galagidae
Genus: Galagoides
 Zanzibar bushbaby, Galagoides zanzibaricus LR/nt
Genus: Otolemur
 Northern greater galago, Otolemur garnettii ssp. garnettii LR/lc
Suborder: Haplorhini
Infraorder: Simiiformes
Parvorder: Catarrhini
Superfamily: Cercopithecoidea
Family: Cercopithecidae (Old World monkeys)
Genus: Chlorocebus
 Vervet monkey, Chlorocebus pygerythrus ssp. nesiotes LR/lc - P
 Blue monkey, Cercopithecus mitis ssp. albogularis LR/lc
Subfamily: Colobinae
Genus: Procolobus
 Zanzibar red colobus, Procolobus kirkii EN
Superfamily: Hominoidea
Family: Hominidae 
Subfamily: Homininae
Tribe: Hominini
Genus: Homo
 Human, Homo sapiens ssp. sapiens LC

Order: Carnivora (carnivorans) 

Well over 250 species of carnivorans, they are the supreme specialists which fill up the highest ranks in food webs.

Suborder: Feliformia
Family: Felidae (cats)
Subfamily: Pantherinae
Genus: Panthera
 Leopard, P. pardus
Zanzibar leopard, P. p. pardus possibly 
Family: Herpestidae (mongooses)
Genus: Atilax
 Marsh mongoose, Atilax paludinosus ssp. rubescens LR/lc - P
Genus: Bdeogale
 Bushy-tailed mongoose, Bdeogale crassicauda ssp. tenuis LR/lc
Genus: Galerella
 Slender mongoose, Galerella sanguinea LR/lc
Genus: Mungos
 Banded mongoose, Mungos mungo LR/lc
Family: Viverridae (civets, mongooses, etc.)
Subfamily: Viverrinae
Genus: Genetta
 Servaline genet, Genetta servalina
Zanzibar servaline genet, G. s. archeri
Genus: Civettictis
 African civet, Civettictis civetta LR/lc

Order: Hyracoidea (hyraxes) 

Hyraxes are small, herbivorous mammals in the order Hyracoidea, which included 4 living species.

Family: Procaviidae (hyraxes)
Genus: Dendrohyrax
 Southern tree hyrax, Dendrohyrax arboreus LC

Order: Artiodactyla (even-toed ungulates) 

The Artiodactyls are even-toed ungulates. There are about 220 artiodactyl species, including many that are of great economic importance to humans, such as cattle, and antelopes.

Family: Suidae (pigs)
Subfamily: Suinae
Genus: Potamochoerus
 Bushpig, Potamochoerus larvatus LR/lc
Genus: Sus
 Wild boar, Sus scrofa LR/lc
Family: Bovidae (cattle, antelope, sheep, goats)
Genus: Cephalophus
 Aders's duiker, Cephalophus adersi CR
 Blue duiker, Cephalophus monticola ssp. sundavalli LR/lc
Genus: Neotragus
 Suni, Neotragus moschatus LC

Order: Rodentia (rodents) 

Rodents make up the largest order of mammals, with over 40% of mammalian species. They have ever growing two incisors in the upper and lower jaw.

Suborder: Hystricognathi
Family: Sciuridae (squirrels)
Subfamily: Xerinae
Tribe: Protoxerini
Genus: Heliosciurus
 Zanj sun squirrel, Heliosciurus undulatus DD
 Red bush squirrel, Paraxerus palliatus ssp. frerei LC
Family: Muridae (mice, rats, voles, gerbils, hamsters, etc.)
Subfamily: Murinae
Genus: Cricetomys
 Gambian pouched rat, Cricetomys gambianus ssp. cosensi LC
Genus: Mus
 House mouse, Mus musculus ssp. gentilis LC
 Brown rat, Rattus norvegicus LC
 Black rat, Rattus rattus LC

Notes

See also
List of chordate orders
Lists of mammals by region
Mammal classification
List of mammals described in the 2000s

References

External links
Online key to mammals of Tanzania

Zanzibar
Mammals

Mammals